The British Society for Nanomedicine (BSNM) is the primary UK nanomedicine society. Members of the society are drawn from the general public, academia, industry, regulatory agencies and healthcare professionals. The society is a registered charity whose mission includes the direct explanation of the ongoing science and commercial developments to allow the public to understand and stay in touch with nanomedicine research as it impacts future global healthcare. The society is also actively involved in the organisation of multidisciplinary scientific meetings to encourage dissemination of the latest advances and foster collaboration.

History 
The Society was founded in 2012, in Liverpool at its inaugural meeting that was attended by over 70 scientists from different disciplines from around the globe. The motivation for creation of the society originated by the first Chair (Professor Andrew Owen) and Vice Chair (Professor Steve Rannard) of the board of trustees from the University of Liverpool, with support from colleagues at Swansea University (Professor Steve Conlan) and Herriot Watt University (Professor Vicki Stone). The inaugural meeting attracted delegates from around the world including active board members for the American Society for Nanomedicine (ASNM) and the European Foundation for Clinical Nanomedicine (CLINAM). Since then, the society has continued to grow and has Trustees from all four nations of the United Kingdom. The society has hosted annual meetings at Swansea University, the University of Strathclyde, Queen's University of Belfast, and the Francis Crick Institute in London.

Publication 
Prior to 2019, the British Society For Nanomedicine publishes a journal which promotes nanomedicine; The Journal of Interdisciplinary Nanomedicine (JOIN) is published by Wiley

Since 2020, the British Society of Nanomedicine has been  also pleased working in partnership with the Journal of Precision Nanomedicine.

References

External links 
 Official website

Health charities in the United Kingdom
Health in Liverpool
Medical associations based in the United Kingdom
Nanomedicine
Nanotechnology institutions
Organisations based in Liverpool
Organizations established in 2012
2012 establishments in England
Transhumanist organizations
University of Liverpool